The Ulriken Tunnel is a railway tunnel on the Bergen Line between Bergen Station and Arna Station in Bergen Municipality in Vestland county, Norway.

Original (old) tunnel 
Before the tunnel was opened in 1964, the Bergen Line ran via Nesttun. This stretch is now a heritage railway, the Old Voss Line. The tunnel has single track and is electrified.

New tunnel 
The Norwegian National Rail Administration has plans for building a second tunnel through the mountain. Work on boring the  tunnel began in January 2016 and it is the first in Norway to use a tunnel boring machine. On August 29, 2017 infrastructure manager Bane Nor and contractors Strabag and Skanska successfully completed the boring of the new tunnel. The next step is to blow 16 crossings from the new to the old tunnel, and to make the tunnel ready for use by railway traffic. Completion of the new double-track tunnel was expected in 2020, and it opened in December of that year.

References

Railway tunnels in Vestland
Tunnels on the Bergen Line
1964 establishments in Norway
Tunnels completed in 1964